Streletskoye is a rural locality (a selo) in Belgorodsky District, Belgorod Oblast, Russia. The population was 6,862 as of 2010. There are 90 streets.

Geography 
Streletskoye is located 16 km north of Maysky (the district's administrative centre) by road. Dragunskoye is the nearest rural locality.

References 

Rural localities in Belgorodsky District
Belgorodsky Uyezd